Macquarie Island orchid  may refer to:

 Nematoceras dienemum, windswept helmet orchid
 Nematoceras sulcatum, grooved helmet orchid